Yu Lin-ya (born 29 June 1950) is a Taiwanese politician who served in the Legislative Yuan from 1993 to 1999.

Yu was born in 1950, to the Yu family of Kaohsiung. Her grandfather, mother, and brothers were also politicians. Yu studied history at National Chengchi University and completed graduate work at National Sun Yat-sen University (NSYSU). She later became president of the Private Kao Yuan Junior College of Technology.

Yu began her political career as a member of the Taiwan Provincial Assembly. Elected to the Legislative Yuan in 1992 and 1995, Yu later served as vice chair of the Research, Development and Evaluation Commission and speaker of the Taiwan Provincial Consultative Council.

In 2017, the Ciaotou District Court in Kaohsiung ruled that Yu was guilty on charges of breach of trust, as she had used funds from Kao Yuan to pay her personal assistant from 1988 to 2006. The Kaohsiung branch of the Taiwan High Court upheld the guilty verdict in 2018, reducing her sentence from two years to nine months imprisonment.

References

1950 births
Living people
National Sun Yat-sen University alumni
National Chengchi University alumni
20th-century Taiwanese women politicians
Democratic Progressive Party Members of the Legislative Yuan
Members of the 2nd Legislative Yuan
Members of the 3rd Legislative Yuan
Kaohsiung Members of the Legislative Yuan
Party List Members of the Legislative Yuan
Yu family of Kaohsiung
Taiwanese politicians convicted of crimes